Frank John Forelli, Jr. (8 April 1932, San Diego – 5 September 1994, Madison, Wisconsin) was an American mathematician, specializing in the functional analysis of holomorphic functions.

Forelli received his bachelor's degree from the University of California, Berkeley and then, after 3 years as an officer in the U. S. Navy, returned to Berkeley. He received there in 1961 his Ph.D. under Henry Helson with thesis Marcel Riesz's theorem on conjugate functions. In 1961 Forelli joined the faculty of the University of Wisconsin–Madison, where he remained for the remainder of his life.

Upon his death, he was survived by his wife and two daughters.

Selected publications

References

20th-century American mathematicians
1932 births
1994 deaths
People from San Diego
University of California, Berkeley alumni
Complex analysts
Functional analysts
Mathematical analysts
University of Wisconsin–Madison faculty